The large white-bellied rat (Niviventer excelsior), also known as the Sichuan niviventer, is a species of rodent in the family Muridae.
It is found only in southwestern China. It occurs in Jiuzhaigou National Nature Reserve of Sichuan, southwestern Sichuan, northwestern Yunnan, and the Ailao Mountains of Yunnan.

References

Niviventer
Mammals described in 1911
Taxa named by Oldfield Thomas
Taxonomy articles created by Polbot